Angela Bennett (born circa 1943/1944) is an Australian mining heiress and businesswoman.

Biography
Her late father, Peter Wright, co-founded Wright Prospecting. Her late brother was Michael Wright (1937–2012), the owner of the Voyager Estate winery in Margaret River.

She heads Wright Prospecting. She owns fifteen per cent of Hamersley Iron shares from the Rio Tinto Group, Gina Rinehart owning the other fifty per cent. In September 2012, she sued Rinehart to recover fifty per cent of 4, 5 and 6 tenements of the Hope Downs mine, named after Gina Rinehart's late mother, Hope Hancock.

Personal life
Bennett is married and has seven children.

Her son, Todd Bennett, was appointed to the Board of Directors of Apex Mineral in 2008, but he no longer sits on it as of 2012. He also sat on the Board of the Finance and Energy Exchange.

Net worth 

 Bennett was the third-richest woman in Australia by net worth. In 2014, the Business Review Weekly assessed Bennett's net worth at 1.55 billion. In September 2009, she sold her home in the Mosman Park neighbourhood of Perth for 57.5 million and downsized to a 8 million apartment in West Perth. In 2010, she sold her 20 million yacht.

References

Living people
People from Perth, Western Australia
Australian businesspeople
Australian billionaires
Australian women in business
1940s births
Female billionaires